Evarine Suzeni Katongo (born 29 December 2002) is a Zambian footballer plays as a midfielder for ZISD Queens and the Zambia women's national team. She is part of the Zambian Football team in the football competition at the 2020 Summer Olympics.

References

2002 births
Living people
Zambian women's footballers
Zambia women's international footballers
Footballers at the 2020 Summer Olympics
Olympic footballers of Zambia
Women's association football midfielders
Zambian people of Democratic Republic of the Congo descent